Tamdaopteron is an Asian genus of bush crickets in the subfamily Phaneropterinae. Records for the two species are from Vietnam.

Species
The Catalogue of Life lists:
Tamdaopteron major Gorochov, 2005 - type species
Tamdaopteron minor Gorochov, 2005

References

Tettigoniidae genera
Phaneropterinae
Orthoptera of Vietnam